Desert Oasis High School is a public high school located in Enterprise, in Las Vegas, Nevada, in the United States. Opened in August 2008, the school is a part of the Clark County School District and was the first new public school to be opened in Clark County since Legacy High School was opened in 2006. The school also transferred approximately 1,000 students from Sierra Vista High School and others from Liberty High School.

Curriculum
Among the normal curricula available at most Las Vegas area high schools, Desert Oasis offers several alternative programs including those in the areas of Business and Career and Technical Education.  Some of the classes offered in these programs include: accounting, woodworking, marketing, sports medicine, and sports, entertainment, and recreational marketing.

Sports program
 The athletics programs at Desert Oasis High School compete in the NIAA - Division 1 - Sunset Northwest League.
 Fall sports: Cheer, Boys & Girls Cross Country, Football, Girls Golf, Boys & Girls Soccer, Boys & Girls Tennis, and Girls Volleyball.
 Winter sports: Cheer, Boys & Girls Basketball, Boys & Girls Bowling, Girls Flag Football, and Wrestling.
 Spring sports: Cheer, Baseball, Boys Golf, Softball, Boys & Girls Swimming & Diving, Boys & Girls Track & Field, and Boys Volleyball.

State titles
 Men's Bowling (2016), Baseball (2019)
 Disc Golf (2012, 2013, 2014, 2015, 2016)

Notable alumni
 Cameron Jefferson (2010) - professional football player
 Bryson Stott (2016) - professional baseball player

Feeder schools
Charles and Phyllis Frias Elementary School (2008)
Aldeane Comnito Ries Elementary School
Evelyn Stuckey Elementary School (2010)
Dennis Ortwein Elementary School (2018)
Beverly S. Mathis Elementary School (2017)
Jan Jones Blackhurst Elementary School (2017)
Carolyn S. Reedom Elementary School (2008)
William V. Wright Elementary School (2006)
Mark L. Fine Elementary School (2009)
Lois and Jerry Tarkanian Middle School (2006)
Lawrence and Heidi Cannarelli Middle School (2003)

Principals 
The following have served as principals of the School:
 Emil Wozniak (2008-2014)
 A. J. Adams (2014-2017)
 Kelly O'Rourke (2017-2019)
 Jennifer Boedekker (2019-2022)
 Ian Salzman (2022-present)

References

External links
Desert Oasis High School homepage

Clark County School District
Educational institutions established in 2008
High schools in Clark County, Nevada
Buildings and structures in Enterprise, Nevada
2008 establishments in Nevada
Public high schools in Nevada